Senator Street Historic District is a national historic district in Bay Ridge, Brooklyn, New York, New York.  It consists of 40 contributing residential buildings (including two garages) built between 1906 and 1912.  They are all three story brownstone rowhouses in the Neo-Renaissance style.  The houses feature high stoops and full sized subterranean basements.

It was listed on the National Register of Historic Places in 2002.

References

Renaissance Revival architecture in New York (state)
Bay Ridge, Brooklyn
Historic districts on the National Register of Historic Places in Brooklyn